Castlevania Puzzle: Encore of the Night is a 2010 Castlevania puzzle game featuring Alucard and other Castlevania: Symphony of the Night characters for iOS and Windows Phone. It retells the story of Symphony of the Night. It features a role-playing game system and touched up sprites. The game was released on iOS on July 21, 2010 and for Windows Phone on January 18, 2011.

Reception 

The iOS version received "favorable" reviews according to the review aggregation website Metacritic.

Game Informers Tim Turi called it his "go-to puzzle game" on his iPhone in part due to its use of Symphony of the Nights sprites.

See also 
Taisen Puzzle-Dama

References

External links 
 

2010 video games
IOS games
Puzzle video games
Single-player video games
Video game remakes
Video games developed in Japan
Windows Mobile games
Role-playing video games
Castlevania spin-off games